Pilón is a municipality and town in the Granma Province of Cuba. It is located on the southern coast of Cuba, in an inlet of the Caribbean Sea.

Demographics
In 2004, the municipality of Pilón had a population of 29,751.

Transport
The town is crossed by the state highway "Circuito Sur de Oriente" (CSO).

See also
Pilón music style
Municipalities of Cuba
List of cities in Cuba

References

External links

Populated places in Granma Province